is an LNG-fired thermal power station operated by Tohoku Electric in the city of Niigata, Japan. The facility is located on the Sea of Japan coast.

History
The Niigata Thermal Power Station Unit 1 started operation in July 1963. At that time, it was Japan's first power plant capable of using a mixture of natural gas and heavy oil. A total of four units were constructed between 1963 and 1969. Unit 2 was abolished in 1983 and Unit 1 in 1984 due to  obsolescence.  Plans for a lifetime extension on Unit 3 were cancelled in 2006 and the plant was abolished in 2009.

Unit 5, which adopted a high-efficiency combined cycle power generation system was under construction at the time of the 2011 Tōhoku earthquake and tsunami and came on line from July 30, 2011. 

Due to the electrical shortfall in the aftermath of the earthquake, Unit 6 was constructed as an emergency generation station, and came on line on January 31, 2012. It was taken offline on March 21, 2015 after alternative and lower cost sources of energy came on line and infrastructure damaged by the earthquake was repaired. 

Unit 4 was abolished in September 2018.

In the past, the Niigata Thermal Power Station used natural gas sent by a  pipeline from the Aga-oki oil and gas field, which was located offshore. It now uses imported liquefied natural gas (LNG).

Plant details

See also 

 Energy in Japan
 List of power stations in Japan

External links
Tohoku Electric list of major power stations

1963 establishments in Japan
Energy infrastructure completed in 1963
Natural gas-fired power stations in Japan
Buildings and structures in Niigata (city)